Margaret Betty Belton (1 February 1916 – 24 January 1989) was an English cricketer who played primarily as a bowler. She appeared in three Test matches for England in 1937, all against Australia. She played domestic cricket for Nottinghamshire.

References

External links
 
 

1916 births
1989 deaths
People from Lowdham
Cricketers from Nottinghamshire
England women Test cricketers
Nottinghamshire women cricketers